Physella acuta is a species of small, left-handed or sinistral, air-breathing freshwater snail, an aquatic gastropod mollusk in the family Physidae. Common names include European physa, tadpole snail, bladder snail, and acute bladder snail. In addition, Physa acuta, Physa heterostropha (Say, 1817) and Physa integra (Haldeman, 1841) are synonyms of Physella acuta (Draparnaud, 1805).

Etymology
The etymology of the name Physella is obscure but could be ultimately from a Greek root. "Physella" (as a place name) is recorded in Giovanni Gemisto's printed edition of Pliny's encyclopedia, perhaps lifted from Ermolao Barbaro's Castigationes Plinianae where it is recorded as Physcella. The French naturalist Jacques Draparnaud was the first to describe a species of the genus Physella and coined the name.

Shell description

Snails in the family Physidae have shells that are sinistral, which means that if the shell is held with the aperture facing the observer and the spire pointing up, then the aperture is on the left-hand side.

The shells of Physella species have a long and large aperture, a pointed spire, and no operculum. The shells are thin and corneous and rather transparent.

Distribution

It was once thought that the indigenous distribution of Physella acuta is Mediterranean. However, when Physella heterostropha is considered to be a synonym, then the indigenous distribution of the species includes North America.

Physella acuta is a common species which is common in all of North America and Europe including the United Kingdom. The species seems to have first spread through the Mediterranean regions and then more slowly into Northern Europe. This species has been introduced into New Zealand and is widespread throughout both islands in ponds, lakes, and running water

In the United Kingdom 
Within the United Kingdom, P. acuta is considered to be an invasive species. The "European physa" or "common bladder snail", as it is commonly known in England, is a prolific species that has undergone naturalisation. The European physa has been observed on several great Rivers, streams and tributaries within England, Wales, Scotland and Northern Ireland including the River Severn and the River Thames. The ecological impact of this invasive species to the native floral and faunal species of the United Kingdom was assessed by the United Kingdom Technical Advisory Group (UKTAG) as "Unknown" under the Water Framework Directive guidelines for Alien species.

In Europe 
This species is found in:
 Belgium
 Serbia (it is especially abundant in the Drina river)
 Croatia
 Italy
 Czech Republic – not evaluated (NE)
 Slovakia
 Germany
 Netherlands
 Pripyat River since 1983 and in Neman River basin in Belarus since 2007
 Denmark
 and others

The distribution also includes Mediterranean regions and Africa.

In the Americas 
The distribution includes the United States: Maryland, New Jersey, Tennessee, and Virginia.
 Cuba – native, also with Tarebia granifera it is the most common freshwater snail in Cuba
Chile invasive

Ecology

Habitat
This species lives in freshwater rivers, streams, lakes, ponds, and swamps.

Physella acuta is frequently found in anthropogenic reservoirs, occurring in warm water discharges from power stations and in some rivers, but very rarely and not numerously in clay pit ponds. It can survive well under temporary harsh conditions (extreme temperature and water pollution), as long as they are short-lived.

Feeding habits 
These snails eat dead plant and animal matter and various other detritus.

Because Physella acuta forages mainly on epiphytic vegetation and on the macrophytes, whereas other gastropods (Planorbis planorbis, Radix ovata) exploit the algal cover or phytobentos on the bottom, competition between Physella acuta and other gastropods appears to be minimal.

Interspecific relationship 
This species successfully co-exists with other alien gastropods: for example with Potamopyrgus antipodarum in many streams, lakes and ponds in New Zealand and with Lithoglyphus naticoides in the Danube River. 
Within the United Kingdom, this species has also been to observed to coexists with Jenkins' Spire-Snail (Potamopyrgus antipodarum) in many aquatic habitats. The presence of the European physa may encourage proliferation of invasive non-native macrophytes such as Nuttall's waterweed (Elodea nuttallii)

Predators 
The bladder snail is a frequent prey of many snail-eating predators, such as
Anomalochromis
Badis badis
Carinotetraodon travancoricus
Puntius titteya
Ambastaia sidthimunki
Chromobotia macracanthus
Clea helena
Sternotherus carinatus

Reproduction

P. acuta is a self-compatible hermaphrodite.  In natural populations, P. acuta preferentially reproduces by outcrossing.  When individuals from such populations self-fertilize they show a high degree of inbreeding depression.  However, in exprerimentally constrained lines (where mates were often unavailable), after about 20 generations of self-fertilization, most of the inbreeding depression was purged.

References
This article incorporates CC-BY-2.0 text (but not under GFDL) from reference.

Further reading 
 Naranjo-García E. & Appleton C. C. (2009). "The architecture of the physid musculature of Physa acuta Draparnaud, 1805 (Gastropoda: Physidae)". African Invertebrates 50(1): 1-11. Abstract

External links
Physa acuta at AnimalBase taxonomy,short description, distribution, biology,status (threats), images 
 https://web.archive.org/web/20071007012447/http://www.aquarium-kosmos.de/inhalt/50/blasenschnecken-physella-acuta

Physidae
Gastropods described in 1805